The Three Stags' Heads is a Grade II listed public house in Wardlow Mires, Derbyshire, England.

On the Campaign for Real Ale's National Inventory of Historic Pub Interiors,
it was built in the mid–late 18th century, with 19th- and 20th-century alterations and additions.

The Three Stags' Heads is referenced as an inspiration for the short story Black Dog by Neil Gaiman.

See also
Listed buildings in Wardlow, Derbyshire

References

Grade II listed pubs in Derbyshire
National Inventory Pubs